El Camino High School at Ventura College (ECHS) is a public independent study and middle college high school in Ventura, California. The school is part of the Ventura Unified School District (VUSD) and is located on the campus of Ventura College.

History
El Camino High School first opened its doors in 1982, consisting of a single classroom at Will Rogers Elementary School in Ventura. The school later moved to its own campus on Dean Drive. In 2008 ECHS relocated to a  lot on the Ventura College campus, allowing it to increase its enrollment significantly, and adopted its current name.

The school was named a California Distinguished School in the 2012–13 school year.

Academics and student life
El Camino High School offers college preparatory courses on an independent study basis that meet University of California "A—G" admission requirements, with educational pathways that include community college classes, internships, community service projects, and participation in work experience. Students are required to complete a minimum of 20 hours of coursework per week and meet with their teacher weekly to submit work and take tests. They must also complete at least one Ventura College course each semester. Many students also work full- or part-time, earning credits towards graduation through work experience classes.

ECHS offers a limited number of extracurricular activities and does not have an athletic program. However, many students supplement their core school work with activities such as music, art, drama, or sports at other local high schools.

References

External links

High schools in Ventura County, California
Public high schools in California
1982 establishments in California